Blas de Lezo (F-103) is a Spanish Navy guided missile frigate of the . This is the third ship class of air defense frigates in the Spanish Navy. It was named after the 18th century Spanish Admiral Blas de Lezo. The ship was built by Izar Shipbuilding in Ferrol, Spain and entered into service in 2004.

Operational history

On 16 May 2003 Blas de Lezo was launched. This was the same day that construction of the frigate  began.

From 7–11 September 2004 Blas de Lezo conducted her sea trials. On 16 December 2004 the frigate was delivered to the Spanish Navy.

In 2007 Blas de Lezo joined the combat group of French nuclear aircraft carrier  for two months. She subsequently had an accident on 25September 2007, during the NATO Neptune Warrior exercises off Scotland. There were no injuries. An emergency repair was carried out at the Navantia-Ferrol facility in Fene, Spain. Then she headed out to Denmark where she took over the command of Permanent Naval Group No.1 of NATO (SNMG-1). In this group, she replaced .

From April 2009 onwards Blas de Lezo, along with other vessels of SNMG-1, participated in NATO's Allied Protector operation to combat piracy in the waters of the Gulf of Aden and the Horn of Africa. On 4 July 2009 during the course of an operation, the crew boarded two vessels suspected of piracy after receiving a warning from the Liberian merchant United Lady of a possible attack.

On 9 April 2012 she sailed from Ferrol, Spain to the east coast of the United States to integrate into Task Force8 of the United States Navy. Following this drill, she became part of an international group aimed at combating drug trafficking in the Caribbean Sea. On 31 May 2012 she returned to her base at Ferrol.

On 11 June 2013 Blas de Lezo sailed from the Naval Station of Rota to take command of NATO Permanent Group No.2 (SNMG-2) based in Aksaz, Turkey, where she arrived on June15. In the course of this deployment, she participated in Ocean Shield, an anti-piracy operation in the Indian Ocean, and Active Endeavor, part of the fight against terrorism in the Mediterranean. On 26 July 2013 she was showcased in Istanbul for The General Directorate of Armaments, Materials of Turkey, and the Navy of Turkey to support Navantia's options in securing a contract for the manufacture of several frigates for Turkey. In early August 2013 the frigate returned to base for maintenance. On 29 August 2013 she departed for the port of Málaga to start the second phase of her deployment which included the participation on the international exercise Brilliant Mariner2013. On 13 October 2013 Blas de Lezo was relieved in Barcelona by Álvaro de Bazán.

On 11 July 2014 the frigate  returned from Operation Atalanta while the remaining four ships of the F-100 class were based in Ferrol. For the first time, the five F-100 frigates conducted joint training exercises as part of the 31stEscort Squadron.

On 28 June 2015 Blas de Lezo received her combat flag in Guecho, offered by the Royal Maritime Club of Abra and the Sports Club; sponsored by Ana of Orleans, Duchess of Calabria. In early October 2015 she participated in exercises of International Joint Ventures in Scottish waters; followed by participation in the multinational exercises Trident Juncture2015, which took place in Spain, Italy and Portugal.

On 22 January 2022, amid the Russo-Ukrainian crisis, Blas de Lezo left Ferrol to join the Standing NATO Maritime Group 2, expected to be deployed in the Black Sea.

References

2003 ships
Frigates
Frigates of the Spanish Navy
Ships built in Spain